"A Little Piece of Heaven" is a song by American heavy metal band Avenged Sevenfold. It is the ninth song from their self-titled fourth album. Though not released as a single, the song is one of the band's most popular. In December, 2007, the song received an animated music video. The song was written by the band's drummer, Jimmy "The Rev" Sullivan, and features him on dueling lead vocals with M. Shadows.

Background
"A Little Piece of Heaven" was written by drummer The Rev. The original version of the song was entitled "Big Bear", which was the name of the cabin the band were staying at when the song was written. The "Big Bear" demo featured The Rev doing all the instruments and vocals. It was originally intended to be on a Halloween EP, but once the band's Record label heard it, they insisted it be on the album.

Lyrics and music
"A Little Piece of Heaven" is about a man who murders his girlfriend, eats her heart, and rapes her corpse. The girlfriend then returns from the dead and does the same to him. The two reconcile, get married, and together they begin killing others.

Songwriter The Rev stated the song was inspired by the works of Danny Elfman and his band Oingo Boingo. The band worked with brass and string sections for the song.  The song is supposedly inspired by Broadway show tunes, in which horns and orchestral strings replaced the band's lead and rhythm guitars.

Members of the band have compared the song to "an eight-minute movie".

Music video
In December 2007, an animated video was made for "A Little Piece of Heaven". The video for the song features a man who, after having his marriage proposal rejected, murders his girlfriend. Due to the song's controversial subject matter, Warner Brothers initially only released it to registered MVI users over the internet. However, it was later released to YouTube on October 26, 2009. 

The video was directed by Rafa Alcantra.

Critical reception and legacy

"A Little Piece of Heaven" is one of the band's most popular songs, and is considered among their best by fans and critics alike. Kerrang and Return of Rock ranked the song at number 1 and number 3 respectively on their lists of the greatest Avenged Sevenfold songs.
Louder Sound also ranked the song at number 11 on their ranking of the band's best songs.
It has over 130 million streams on Spotify and 97 million views on YouTube. It is the top rated song from its parent album on Metacritic. It was voted as the best Avenged Sevenfold song in an official song tournament during March Madness.

The music of the song has been compared to the bands Mr. Bungle and My Chemical Romance, as well as Broadway show tunes. It has also been described as the band's Bohemian Rhapsody. The members of Fearless Vampire Killers had the song in their list of the best Avenged Sevenfold songs, calling it "Like a rock opera within one song".

The song has also been compared to the film scores of composer/musician Danny Elfman, specifically his scores to the films The Nightmare Before Christmas and Beetlejuice.

"A Little Piece of Heaven" has been played 313 times live by Avenged Sevenfold. It is the band's ninth most performed song live overall, directly behind Buried Alive. A live performance of the song was featured on the live album Live in the LBC & Diamonds in the Rough.

Personnel
All credits adapted from the album's liner notes.
Avenged Sevenfold
M. Shadows – co-lead vocals 
The Rev – drums, co-lead vocals, piano, percussion
Zacky Vengeance – rhythm guitar
Synyster Gates – lead guitar, backing vocals
Johnny Christ – bass guitar, backing vocals

Session musicians
Additional vocals by Juliette Commagere
Piano and Organ by Jamie Muhoberac
Upright bass by Miles Mosley
Cello by Cameron Stone
Violins by Caroline Campbell and Neel Hammond
Viola by Andrew Duckles
Choir: Beth Andersen, Monique Donnelly, Rob Giles, Debbie Hall, Scottie Haskell, Luana Jackman, Bob Joyce, Rock Logan, Susie Stevens Logan, Arnold McCuller, Gabriel Mann, and Ed Zajack
Alto sax by Bill Liston and Brandon Fields 
Clarinet by Bill Liston and Rusty Higgins
Tenor sax by Dave Boruff and Rusty Higgins
Bari sax by Joel Peskin
Trumpet by Wayne Bergeron and Dan Foreno
Trombone by Bruce Fowler and Alex Iies
Production
Produced by Avenged Sevenfold
Engineered by Fred Archambault and Dave Schiffman, assisted by Clifton Allen, Chris Steffen, Robert DeLong, Aaron Walk, Mike Scielzi, and Josh Wilbur
Mixed by Andy Wallace
Mastered by Brian Gardner
Drum tech by Mike Fasano
Guitar tech by Walter Rice
'Fan Producers for a Day' (MVI) by Daniel McLaughlin and Christopher Guinn

References

Avenged Sevenfold songs
Songs about infidelity
2007 songs
Avant-garde metal songs